R80 or R-80 may refer to:

Aircraft
 R80 (airship), a British rigid airship
 Bushcaddy R-80, a Canadian ultralight and light-sport aircraft
 Fisher R-80 Tiger Moth, a Canadian kit biplane
 RAI R-80, an Indonesian regional turboprop airliner
 Romano R.80, a French aerobatic biplane

Other uses 
 R80 (South Africa), a road
 Colt R80, a machine gun
 Proteinuria
 R80 series of preferred numbers
 Toyota Noah (R80), a minivan
 R80, a Ferris wheel designed by Ronald Bussink